Serkan Özçağlayan  (born May 8, 1994) is a Turkish-Dutch kickboxer and cousin of Gokhan Saki, currently signed with Glory.

He is ranked as the third best middleweight in the world by Combat Press as of September 2022, and third best by Beyond Kick as of October 2022.

Kickboxing career

Early career
On March 13, 2014 Ozcaglayan face Ayou Ababakre for the Benelux Heavyweight title. He lost the fight by decision.

On October 29, 2017 Ozcaglayan faced Fabio Kwasi at WFL: Manhoef vs. Bonjasky. He lost the fight by TKO in the second round.

Ozcaglayan was scheduled to face Bogdan Stoica at Enfusion #73 for the Heavyweight title. He withdrew from the fight.

On September 6, 2019 Ozcaglayan faced Pavel Zablockiy in the main event of a Tatneft Cup event in Kazan, Russia. He won the fight by first round knockout.

Ozcaglayan for the first 38 fights of his career competed at heavyweight, he weighed up to 130 kg before dropping all the way down to middleweight.

GLORY
Ozcaglayan made his debut for the Glory promotion at Glory Collision 3 Final against Matt Baker. He won the fight by technical knockout in the first minute of the fight. He’s match with win in Knockout lasted 00:58 seconds is chosen the best ranked fight of the year in Glory. This quick victory earned him the 2021 Glory Debut of the Year award.

Ozcaglayan was booked to face the #1 ranked Glory middleweight contender Ertugrul Bayrak Glory 80 on March 19, 2022. He won the fight by decision, after which he earned the #1 ranking in the Glory middleweight division.

Ozcaglayan faced César Almeida at Glory: Collision 4 on October 8, 2022. He lost the fight by unanimous decision. after suffering two knockdowns, one each in the first and second round.

Ozcaglayan faced Juri De Sousa at Glory 82 on November 19, 2022. He won the fight by a three-round technical knockout, after knocking De Sousa down for the fourth time in the fight.

Ozcaglayan faced Sergej Braun at Glory 83 on February 11, 2023. He won the fight by a fourth-round knockout.

Championships and accomplishments
Glory
2021 Glory "Debut of the Year"

Kickboxing record

|- style="background:#cfc;"
| 2023-02-11|| Win||align=left| Sergej Braun || Glory 83 || Essen, Germany || KO (Left hook) ||2  ||2:40 
|-  style="background:#cfc;"
| 2022-11-19 || Win ||align=left| Juri De Sousa || Glory 82 || Bonn, Germany || TKO (4 Knockdowns) || 3 || 2:19

|- style="background:#fbb;"
| 2022-10-08 || Loss|| align="left" | César Almeida || Glory: Collision 4 || Arnhem, Netherlands ||Decision (Unanimous) ||3  ||3:00 

|-  style="background:#cfc"
| 2022-03-19 || Win||align=left| Ertugrul Bayrak || Glory 80 || Hasselt, Belgium || Decision (Unanimous) || 3 ||3:00

|- style="background:#cfc;"
| 2021-10-23 || Win ||align=left| Matt Baker || Glory Collision 3 Final || Arnhem, Netherlands ||  TKO (Punches) || 1 || 0:58

|-  style="background:#cfc"
| 2019-08-30 || Win||align=left| Bruno Susano || Pitbull Promotion || Istanbul, Turkey || Ext.R Decision  || 4 ||3:00

|-  style="background:#cfc"
| 2019-07-21 || Win||align=left| Wendell Roche|| Pitbull Promotion || Istanbul, Turkey || TKO (Doctor stoppage)  || 1 ||

|- style="background:#fbb;"
| 2018-05-05 || Loss ||align=left| Samir Boukhidis || A1 World Combat Cup || Hasselt, Belgium ||  Disqualification || 2 ||

|-  bgcolor="#fbb"
| 2017-10-29 || Loss||align=left| Fabio Kwasi || WFL: Manhoef vs. Bonjasky, Final 16 || Almere, Netherlands || TKO (3 knockdowns) || 2 ||

|-  style="background:#cfc"
| 2017-05-31 || Win||align=left| Michael Yapi|| Tatneft Cup || Kazan, Russia || Ext.R KO (Punches)  || 4 || 1:10

|- style="background:#fbb;"
| 2017-04-29 || Loss ||align=left| Levi Rigters|| Enfusion Live x Fightsense  || Zoetermeer, Netherlands ||Decision (Unanimous) || 3 || 3:00

|-  style="background:#cfc"
| 2017-01-07 || Win||align=left| Dritan Bajramaj|| World Kickboxing Champions Night 2 || Istanbul, Turkey || KO (Right hook)  || 2 || 1:00

|-  style="background:#cfc"
| 2016-09-06 || Win||align=left| Pavel Zablockiy|| Tatneft Cup || Kazan, Russia || KO || 1 ||

|- style="background:#fbb;"
| 2016-04-23 || Loss ||align=left| Radovan Kulla|| World Kickboxing Champions Night  || Istanbul, Turkey  ||Decision ||  3||3:00

|- style="background:#fbb;"
| 2016-04-02 || Loss ||align=left| Fikri Ameziane || Enfusion Live Gold Edition || The Hague, Netherlands ||  Ext.R Decision|| 4 || 3:00

|- style="background:#fbb;"
| 2016-03-05 || Loss ||align=left| André Schmeling|| Ypenburg Fightday 8 || The Hague, Netherlands ||Decision  || 3 || 3:00

|-  style="background:#cfc"
| 2016-01-24 || Win||align=left| Shota Dolidze|| No Guts No Glory 9 || Hellevoetsluis, Netherlands || Decision  || 3 || 3:00

|- style="background:#cfc;"
| 2015-11-28 || Win ||align=left| Andre Langen|| Fightsense || The Hague, Netherlands ||TKO || 1 ||

|-  style="background:#cfc"
| 2014-11-30 || Win||align=left| Tony Jas|| Fightsense || The Hague, Netherlands || KO || 1 || 
|-
! style=background:white colspan=9 |

|- style="background:#cfc;"
| 2014-06-07 || Win ||align=left| Joey Kaptljn ||  Fightsense || The Hague, Netherlands ||  || ||

|- style="background:#cfc;"
| 2014- || Win||align=left| Rodney Immers|| || The Hague, Netherlands ||KO (Punches) || 1 ||

|- style="background:#fbb;"
| 2014-03-13 || Loss ||align=left| Ayoub Ababakre|| Force et Honneur|| Anderlecht, Belgium ||Decision || 5 ||3:00  
|-
! style=background:white colspan=9 |

|- style="background:#fbb;"
| 2014-02-08 || Loss ||align=left| Jamil Meeusen|| Fight Fans 8|| Amsterdam, Netherlands ||TKO (Doctor stoppage)||  2||3:00 
|-
| colspan=9 | Legend''':

See also 
List of male kickboxers

References

External links
 Official Glory profile

Living people
1995 births
Middleweight kickboxers
Heavyweight kickboxers
Dutch male kickboxers
Turkish male kickboxers
Glory kickboxers
Dutch people of Turkish descent